Nichras is a rural locality (a selo) in Turagsky Selsoviet, Tabasaransky District, Republic of Dagestan, Russia. The population was 878 as of 2010. There are 5 streets.

Geography 
Nichras is located 17 km southeast of Khuchni (the district's administrative centre) by road. Zirdag is the nearest rural locality.

References 

Rural localities in Tabasaransky District